Andrew C. Brock (born April 9, 1974) served almost eight terms (2003-2017) as a Republican member of the North Carolina General Assembly, representing the state's thirty-fourth Senate district, including constituents in Davie, Iredell, and Rowan counties. He also served as the Republican deputy whip in the Senate.

Education and early career
Brock is a lifelong resident of Davie County. Brock's grandfather, Burr Brock Sr., served in the North Carolina House of Representatives as well as the Senate. He is a graduate of Davie County High School.

Brock graduated from Western Carolina University in Cullowhee, North Carolina, majoring in economics and political science. Brock was active in the Student Government Association and served as student body president. He was a member of the governing board of the University of North Carolina Association of Student Governments. He was also a member of the Western Carolina University Board of Trustees and the Pi Gamma Mu International Honor Society.

After college, Brock worked for the Conference on Poverty to work toward welfare reform in North Carolina. He then worked for the United States Senator Lauch Faircloth's re-election campaign. Bill Cobey hired Brock to work as campaign manager on Cobey's campaign for chairman of the North Carolina Republican Party. Brock then worked for the Republican Party of North Carolina. He then worked as a campaign manager for U.S. Congressman Walter Jones. Brock also worked for Citizens for a Sound Economy.

State Senate
Brock was elected to the North Carolina Senate in the fall of 2002. He acted as the deputy Republican whip. 
Brock was at times the chairman of the Finance Committee, Natural and Economic Resources Appropriations Committee, Agriculture/ Environment/ Natural Resources Committee, General Government, Health & Human Services Committee, and Joint Information Technology Oversight Committee. Brock served as vice-chairman of the Redistricting committee. He also served as a member of the Joint Governmental Operations Committee, the Finance Committee, the Senate Rules Committee, Appropriations/Base Budget Committee, Program Evaluation Committee, the Emergency Response and Preparedness Committee, Joint Education Oversight Committee, Judiciary 1, and the Ways and Means Committee.

He resigned in 2017 to accept a position on the Board of Review for the state Division of Employment Security.

Run for Congress
On February 22, 2016, Brock announced that he would run for the United States House of Representatives in the newly reconfigured 13th congressional district. Incumbent George Holding had previously announced that he would run in the 2nd district rather than stand for reelection in the 13th.

Brock lost the June 2016 Republican primary to Ted Budd.

Run for Clerk of Court
Brock ran for the Davie County Clerk of Court in late 2021 and early 2022. He lost by around 200 votes to Jason Lawrence in the spring of 2022.

Personal life
Brock is married to Andrea Gentry of the Pino Community in Davie County, and together they have two daughters and one son, Scarlett Hope, Stella Faith, and Turner Ward.

Electoral history

Electoral History of Andrew C. Brock, current North Carolina Senator for the 34th State Senate district covering Rowan and Davie Counties.

References

External links

 

1974 births
Living people
People from Mocksville, North Carolina
Republican Party North Carolina state senators
21st-century American politicians
American United Methodists
Western Carolina University alumni